A googly in cricket is a deceptive delivery bowled by a right-arm leg spin bowler.

Googly may also refer to:
 Googly (2013 film), a Kannada-language romantic comedy film
 Googly (2019 film), a Bengali-language romantic comedy film
 Googly eyed doll or Googly, a type of early 20th century doll

See also
 Googly eyes, small plastic craft supplies used to imitate eyeballs
 Google (disambiguation)
 Googol, the large number 10100